HC Steaua București may refer to:

 CSA Steaua București (Handball) – Handball Club
 CSA Steaua București (Hockey) – Hockey Club